Cabinet of Rafael Caldera may refer to:
 Second presidency of Rafael Caldera
 First presidency of Rafael Caldera